The  Portland Steel season was the third and final season for the arena football franchise in the Arena Football League (AFL). The team was coached by Ron James and played their home games at the Moda Center.

Standings

Schedule

Regular season
The 2016 regular season schedule was released on December 10, 2015.

Playoffs

Roster

References

Portland Steel
Portland Steel seasons
Portland Steel
Portland